The Jesus Family was a Chinese Pentecostal communitarian church established in 1921 by Jing Dianying.  It began in the rural village of Mazhuang, Taian County, Shandong Province. The church was primarily located in rural and semirural areas, where members had everything in common, inspired by the life of the apostles in the book of Acts. In 1949 there were over a hundred of these communities, numbering thousands of people. The church emphasized a simple lifestyle, spiritual experiences like prophecy as well as the second coming of Christ. After the communist takeover in 1952, the Jesus Family was dismantled and its leader, Jing Dianying, was put into prison and died there.

References

Further reading

Pentecostal denominations in Asia
Chinese Independent Churches
Protestantism in China
1927 establishments in China
Christian organizations established in 1927